Ricardo Hernán Pagés (born 2 May 1973) is an Argentine footballer currently playing for Comunicaciones of the Primera B Metropolitana in Argentina.

External links
 

1973 births
Living people
Argentine footballers
Argentine expatriate footballers
Gimnasia y Esgrima de Jujuy footballers
Chacarita Juniors footballers
Club Atlético Belgrano footballers
Instituto footballers
Quilmes Atlético Club footballers
Club Atlético Banfield footballers
Club Atlético Lanús footballers
L.D.U. Quito footballers
Deportes Melipilla footballers
Expatriate footballers in Chile
Expatriate footballers in China
Expatriate footballers in Ecuador
Association football defenders
Footballers from Buenos Aires